"Don't Stop Believing" is a single by Swedish singer Mariette. The song was performed by her in Melodifestivalen 2015 and reached the third place.

Track listing 
Digital download
 "Don't Stop Believing" – 2:51

Charts

Certifications

References 

Melodifestivalen songs of 2015
2015 singles
2015 songs
Mariette Hansson songs